The Battle of Adamclisi was a major battle in the Dacian Wars, fought in the winter of 101 to 102 between the Roman Empire and the Dacians near Adamclisi, in modern Romania.

Background
After the victory of Second Battle of Tapae, Emperor Trajan decided to wait until spring to continue his offensive on Sarmizegetusa, the capital of Dacia. The Dacian king Decebalus benefited from this, and made out a plan along with the neighboring allied tribes of the Roxolans and Bastarnae, to attack south of the Danube, in the Roman province of Moesia, in an attempt to force the Romans to leave their positions in the mountains near Sarmizegetusa.

The battle
The Dacian army, together with the Roxolani and the Bastarnae, crossed the frozen Danube but, because the weather was not cold enough, the ice broke under their weight, causing many to die in the frozen water.

Trajan moved his army from the mountains, following the Dacians into Moesia. A first battle was fought at night somewhere near the town of Nicopolis, a battle with few casualties on either side and with no crucial result. However, as the Romans received reinforcements, they were able to corner the Dacio-Sarmatian army.

The decisive battle was fought at Adamclisi, a difficult battle for both the Dacians and the Romans. Even though the outcome of the battle was a decisive Roman victory, both sides suffered very heavy casualties.

Aftermath
After the battle, Trajan advanced to Sarmizegetusa, Decebalus requesting a truce. Trajan agreed to the peace offerings. This time the peace was favorable to the Roman Empire: Decebalus must yield the territories occupied by the Roman army, and he must give back to the Romans all the weapons and war machines received after 89, when the Romans under Domitian were forced to pay an annual gift to the Dacians.

Decebalus was obliged to reconsider his foreign policies, and “to have friends and enemies the friends and enemies of the Roman Empire”, as described by Dio Cassius.

After the conquest of Dacia following the 105–106 war, Trajan built the Tropaeum Traiani at Adamclisi in 109, in memory of the battle. On the Tropaeum Traiani monument was a frieze comprising 54 metopes.

See also
 Dacian warfare
 Capidava

References

External links
 Biblioteca Dacica
 Enciclopedia Dacica
 
 La colonne d'Adamclisi ou le trophée de Trajan  La colonne d'Adamclisi en photos

Adamclisi 101
102
Adamclisi
Adam
History of Dobruja
101